Peter Doohan and Laurie Warder were the defending champions, but only Warder competed that year with Tim Pawsat.

Pawsat and Warder lost in the semifinals to Kelly Evernden and Nicolás Pereira.

Evernden and Pereira won in the final 6–4, 7–6 against Sergio Casal and Emilio Sánchez.

Seeds
Champion seeds are indicated in bold text while text in italics indicates the round in which those seeds were eliminated.

 Tim Pawsat /  Laurie Warder (semifinals)
 Sergio Casal /  Emilio Sánchez (final)
 Grant Connell /  Glenn Michibata (first round)
 Paul Chamberlin /  Tim Wilkison (first round)

Draw

References
 1990 BP National Championships Doubles Draw

BP National Championships
BP National Championships